Joseph Henry Meyers (December 5, 1871 – April 11, 1959) was an American college football coach who was the fifth head coach for the Iowa State Cyclones. He held that position for the 1899 season. His career coaching record at Iowa State University, located in Ames, Iowa, was 5 wins, 4 losses and 1 tie. This ranks him 20th at Iowa State in total wins and sixth in winning percentage. He was an alumnus of Iowa State College (class of 1895), lettering in football in 1895. He played halfback. Meyers married Cecilia Wolfe in 1899. His wife had predeceased him in 1910.

References

External links
 

1871 births
1959 deaths
19th-century players of American football
American football halfbacks
Iowa State Cyclones football coaches
Iowa State Cyclones football players
People from Chickasaw County, Iowa